Allie Morse (born March 22, 1994) is an American ice hockey goaltender, currently playing with the Minnesota Whitecaps of the Premier Hockey Federation (PHF).

Playing career 
During her teenage years, Morse attended Park High School in Minnesota, serving as the starting goaltender for the school's girls' hockey team. She was named a semifinalist for the Let's Play Hockey Senior Goalie of the Year Award in 2012.

From 2012 to 2016, she attended Providence College, where she played for the Friars women's ice hockey programme. She was named Hockey East Defensive Player of the Week in November 2014. As a junior she started in 29 games as and finished her career with an .886 save percentage.

In 2017, she joined the then-independent Minnesota Whitecaps ahead of the team's exhibition tour in Sweden against Swedish Women's Hockey League (SDHL) clubs. She would return to the Whitecaps for the 2019–20 NWHL season to serve as Amanda Leveille's backup.

Personal life 
Morse has been noted for her social media collaborations with fellow Whitecaps' goalie Amanda Leveille. Her father, Steve Morse, has served as a head coach for the Park High School hockey team.

References

External links

1994 births
Living people
American women's ice hockey goaltenders
Ice hockey players from Minnesota
People from Cottage Grove, Minnesota
Minnesota Whitecaps players
Providence Friars women's ice hockey players
21st-century American women